Oculocerebrocutaneous syndrome  is a condition characterized by orbital cysts, microphthalmia, porencephaly, agenesis of the corpus callosum, and facial skin tags.

Presentation

These include

 Skin lesions
 Hypoplastic or aplastic skin defects
 Pedunculated, hamartomatous or nodular skin appendages
 Eye lesions
Cystic microphthalmia
 Brain lesions
 Forebrain anomalies
 Agenesis of the corpus callosum
 Enlarged lateral ventricles 
 Interhemispheric cysts
 Hydrocephalus
 Polymicrogyria
 Periventricular nodular heterotopia
 Mid-hindbrain malformation
 Giant dysplastic tectum
 Absent cerebellar vermis
 Small cerebellar hemispheres
 Large posterior fossa fluid collections

Genetics

This is not understood but it is suspected that the gene(s) responsible may lie on the X chromosome.

Diagnosis

Differential diagnosis

 Aicardi syndrome
 Encephalocraniocutaneous lipomatosis
 Focal dermal hypoplasia
 Oculo-auriculo-vertebral spectrum

Epidemiology

This is a rare condition with only 26 cases diagnosed by 2005. 

There is a marked male preponderance.

See also 
 Ocular rosacea
 List of cutaneous conditions

References

External links 

Genodermatoses
Rare syndromes